The Old Dublin Society was founded in 1934. Its mission is to promote the history of Dublin and its citizens.

Membership 
Membership of the society is open to everyone interested in the history of Dublin and Dubliners, most of whom are amateurs though there are some professional historians members.

Publications 
The Dublin Historical Record is the journal of the society.

Library 
The Library of the Old Dublin Society is located in the Royal Dublin Society (RDS) premises, Ballsbridge, Dublin 4.

References

External links 
 
 Dublin Historical Record

1934 establishments in Ireland
Organizations established in 1934
Historical societies based in the Republic of Ireland
Seanad nominating bodies